The 1974-75 season was FC Dinamo București's 26th season in Divizia A. Dinamo dominated the national championship, winning the first six matches and leading from start to finish. Instead, they left the Romanian Cup yet again in the last 32. In Europe, Dinamo played in the UEFA Cup and after the eliminating Boluspor, failed in the confrontation with F.C. Koln: 1-1 and 2-3!

Dudu Georgescu became the championship's top scorer, with 33 goals, and also won the European Golden Boot, being the first Romanian football player winner of a European prize.

Results

UEFA Cup 

First round

Dinamo București won 4-0 on aggregate

Second round

FC Köln won 4-3 on aggregate

Squad 

Goalkeepers: Mircea Constantinescu (32 / 0); Constantin Ștefan (1 / 0); Iosif Cavai (2 / 0).
Defenders: Florin Cheran (31 / 0); Vasile Dobrău (32 / 0); Alexandru Sătmăreanu (29 / 3); Augustin Deleanu (33 / 0); Gabriel Sandu (25 / 2); Teodor Lucuță (3 / 0).
Midfielders:  Cornel Dinu (30 / 3); Radu Nunweiller (29 / 2); Viorel Sălceanu (5 / 1); Marin Ion (6 / 0); George Marincel (1 / 0); Marian Vlad (1 / 0).
Forwards: Alexandru Custov (31 / 2); Alexandru Moldovan (11 / 0); Dudu Georgescu (31 / 33); Florea Dumitrache (10 / 4); Toma Zamfir (31 / 8); Mircea Lucescu (31 / 4); Cristian Vrînceanu (8 / 0); Ionel Augustin (5 / 0).
(league appearances and goals listed in brackets)

Manager: Nicolae Dumitru.

Transfers 

Constantin Traian Ștefan is transferred from U Cluj at the beginning of the season. George Marincel is transferred from Viitorul Scornicești at the mid-season. Florian Dumitrescu is transferred to Steaua and Viorel Sălceanu to FC Galați.

Marin Ion and Ionel Augustin are promoted from the youth team.

References 

 www.labtof.ro
 www.romaniansoccer.ro

1974
Association football clubs 1974–75 season
Dinamo
1974